DeGraffenried Park Historic District is a national historic district located at New Bern, Craven County, North Carolina. It encompasses 86 contributing buildings and 1 contributing site in a residential section of New Bern developed between 1926 and 1956.  The district is characterized by dwellings in the Colonial Revival and Tudor Revival styles. Located in the district is the site of DeGraffenried Park.

It was listed on the National Register of Historic Places in 2006.

References

Historic districts on the National Register of Historic Places in North Carolina
Tudor Revival architecture in North Carolina
Colonial Revival architecture in North Carolina
Geography of Craven County, North Carolina
Buildings and structures in New Bern, North Carolina
National Register of Historic Places in Craven County, North Carolina